Anni Keisala (born 5 April 1997) is a Finnish ice hockey goaltender and member of the Finnish national team, currently signed with HV71 Dam of the Swedish Women's Hockey League (SDHL) for the 2022–23 season.

Playing career
Keisala made her senior club debut at age 13 as the third goaltender and an occasional forward on the women's representative team of Lohjan Kisa-Veikot (LoKV) in the 2010–11 season of the Naisten SM-sarja (NSMs; renamed Naisten Liiga (NSML) in 2017). In the following season, the role of starting netminder fell on fourteen-year-old Keisala after the starter and backup goalies from the previous season left LoKV for other NSMs teams. The teen struggled in net behind the worst team in the league, as LoKV lost all 16 games in the preliminaries – managing to record just seven goals in the series – and were relegated to the Naisten I-divisioona after finishing the 15-game promotion/relegation series in last place.

LoKV's fortunes did not improve in the 2012–13 Naisten I-divisioona season. They were further relegated to the third tier Naisten Suomi-sarja at the conclusion of the promotion and relegation series. Keisala continued playing as both a forward and goaltender during the season. Though player statistics for the season are largely incomplete, she served in goal for a minimum of four games of the preliminaries and one game of the promotion and relegation series. She tallied at least 1 goal in the promotion and relegation series while playing as a forward.

The move was pivotal in her goaltending career, as she returned to playing in the Naisten SM-sarja with Team Oriflame Kuortane, the junior development team of the Finnish Ice Hockey Association, the roster of which featured several future national team talents. She began her rookie season with Team Kuortane as third goaltender behind the 1A/1B duo of Eveliina Suonpää and Tiina Ranne and recorded a below-average .891 save percentage across eight games in the preliminaries. Despite the rocky start, Keisala came into her own during the promotion/relegation series, playing in five of ten games and leading all goaltenders in the series with a stellar .936 save percentage.

She was the recipient of the Tuula Puputti Award as the Goaltender of the Year in the 2014–15 and 2015–16 Naisten SM-sarja seasons while playing with Team Kuortane, and in the 2020–21 Naisten Liiga season, while playing with the Ilves Tampere; she was named to the league's All-Star team in the same three seasons. In 2017, she won the Aurora Borealis Cup with Oulun Kärpät.

International play
Her first match with the senior national team came during the 2015–16 Women's Euro Hockey Tour.
She represented Finland at the IIHF Women's World Championship in 2016, where Finland placed fourth, and in 2017, where Finland won bronze. 

A series of injuries kept Keisala from being named to the national team for several years until she made her triumphant return to the world stage for the 2021 IIHF Women's World Championship, backstopping the team to a bronze medal and earning selection as Best Goaltender by the tournament directorate.

As a member of the Finnish national under-18 ice hockey team, she participated in the IIHF Women's World U18 Championship in 2012 and 2013.

References

External links
 
 

1997 births
Living people
Finnish women's ice hockey goaltenders
HV71 Dam players
Ice hockey players at the 2022 Winter Olympics
Ilves Naiset players
LoKV Naiset players
Medalists at the 2022 Winter Olympics
Olympic ice hockey players of Finland
Olympic bronze medalists for Finland
Olympic medalists in ice hockey
Oulun Kärpät Naiset players
People from Lohja
Sportspeople from Uusimaa
Team Kuortane players